Camil Schertz or Camil Scherz (also known as Kamill Fuszek; 6 February 1921 – 1983) was a Romanian professional footballer and manager of Jewish ethnicity. As a footballer, Schertz played for Club Atletic Oradea, Csepel and ITA Arad, among others, also winning the 1948 Romanian title with ITA Arad. After retirement, Schertz was the manager of Club Atletic Oradea (named at that time as Progresul Oradea), club with which won the 1956 Cupa României.

Honours

Player
Nagyvárad AC
Nemzeti Bajnokság II: 1940–41

ITA Arad
Divizia A: 1947–48

Manager
Progresul Oradea
Cupa României: 1956; runner-up 1955

References

External links
Camil Schertz at nela.hu
Camil Schertz at magyarfutball.hu

1921 births
1983 deaths
Sportspeople from Oradea
Romanian footballers
Association football forwards
Liga I players
Liga II players
Nemzeti Bajnokság I players
Nemzeti Bajnokság II players
CA Oradea players
Csepel SC footballers
Maccabi București players
FC UTA Arad players
Stăruința Oradea players
Romanian football managers
CA Oradea managers